Benebarak ("Sons of Barak") (Bnei Brak) was a biblical city mentioned in the Book of Joshua. According to the biblical account it was  allocated to the Tribe of Dan.

In the Talmudic era, Beneberak became the seat of the court of Rabbi Akiva, and is identified as the site of his all-night seder in the Passover Haggadah.

Benebarak was also associated with agriculture, as evident from the Talmudic account of the sage Rami bar Yehezkel, who declared that he understood the meaning of the Torah's description of the Land of Israel as a "land flowing with milk and honey" after a scene he witnessed in  Beneberak. He saw goats grazing beneath fig trees and the honey oozing from the very ripe figs merged with the milk dripping from the goats and formed a stream of milk and honey.

The Palestinian village of Ibn Ibraq ("Son of Ibraq/Barak") was located on the site of the biblical city and its name was seen as a continuation of the name of the ancient site. In 1924, the Jewish agricultural settlement of Bnei Brak, which was named for the ancient city, was established   to the north. Ibn Ibraq's Arab villagers subsequently renamed it al-Khayriyya to distinguish it from Bnei Brak. Al-Khayriyya was depopulated during a military assault as part of Operation Hametz during the 1948 Arab-Israeli War. 

A large waste transfer station, known as Hiriya, was built at the ancient/modern site, now converted into the Ariel Sharon Park.

References

Hebrew Bible cities
Arab villages depopulated during the 1948 Arab–Israeli War
Talmud places
Tribe of Dan